Anisa Petrova (born 23 December 1970) is a Uzbekistani fencer. She competed in the women's individual épée event at the 2000 Summer Olympics.

References

External links
 

1970 births
Living people
Uzbekistani female épée fencers
Olympic fencers of Uzbekistan
Fencers at the 2000 Summer Olympics
20th-century Uzbekistani women
21st-century Uzbekistani women